ATP may refer to:

Science, technology and biology 
Adenosine triphosphate, an organic chemical used for driving biological processes
ATPase, any enzyme that makes use of adenosine triphosphate
Advanced Technology Program, US government program
Anti-tachycardia pacing, process similar to a pacemaker
Alberta Taciuk process, for extracting oil from shale, etc.
Automated theorem proving, method of proving mathematical theorems by computer programs

Companies and organizations 

 Association of Tennis Professionals, men's professional tennis governing body
 American Technical Publishers, employee-owned publishing company
 Armenia Tree Project, non-profit organization
 Association for Transpersonal Psychology
 ATP architects engineers, architecture- and engineering office for integrated design
 ATP Oil and Gas, defunct US energy company

Entertainment, arts and media 
Adenosine Tri-Phosphate (band), Japanese alternative rock/pop band
All Tomorrow's Parties (festival), UK organisation
ATP Recordings, record label
Alberta Theatre Projects, professional, not-for-profit, Canadian theatre company
Associated Talking Pictures, former name of Ealing Studios, a television and film production company

Transport 
British Aerospace ATP, airliner
 Airline transport pilot license
 ATP Flight School, US
 ATP (treaty), UN treaty that establishes standards for the international transport of perishable food
 Aitape Airport, Papua New Guinea, IATA code
 Automatic train protection, system installed in trains to prevent collisions through driver error
Automatic Train Protection (United Kingdom), method of beacon based railway cab signalling

Economics 
 Available-to-promise, responding to customer order enquiries
 , a Danish pension
 , a Swedish pension

Other uses 
 Around-the-post, a term used in the game of pickleball